C.D. Atlético Junior is a Honduran football club based in El Negrito, Honduras.

History
The club was relegated to Liga Mayor de Honduras at the end of the 2006–07 season. They returned to the Honduran second division after purchasing the licence of Lenca in 2008.

See also
Football in Honduras

References

Football clubs in Honduras